Cholevini is a tribe of small carrion beetles in the family Leiodidae. There are more than 20 genera and 200 described species in Cholevini.

Genera
These 25 genera belong to the tribe Cholevini:

 Apocatops Zwick, 1968
 Apterocatops Miyama, 1985
 Attaephilus Motschoulsky, 1870
 Attumbra Gozis, 1886
 Catopidius Jeannel, 1922
 Catopodes Portevin, 1914
 Catops Paykull, 1798
 Catopsimorphus Aubé, 1850
 Catoptrichus Murray, 1856
 Chionocatops Ganglbauer, 1899
 Choleva Latreille, 1796
 Cholevinus Reitter, 1901
 Dreposcia Jeannel, 1922
 Dzungarites Jeannel, 1936
 Fissocatops Zwick, 1968
 Fusi (beetle)|Fusi
 Himalops Perreau, 1986
 Mesocatops Szymczakowski, 1961
 Nargus Thomson, 1867
 Nipponemadus Perreau, 2004
 Philomessor Jeannel, 1936
 Prionochaeta Horn, 1880
 Rybinskiella Reitter, 1906
 Sciodrepoides Hatch, 1933
 Takobiella Ruzicka, 1992

References

Further reading

External links

 
 

Leiodidae